Hundred Dollar Bag is a compilation album by the reggae artist Beenie Man, covering songs from his early career. It was self-released with no promotion.

Track listing
 "Boogie Down" - 3:48
 "Feel Good" - 3:50
 "Hundred Dollar Bag" - 2:16
 "Watch It" - 2:49
 "Storm" - 3:50
 "Sleep with Me" - 3:25
 "Going Away" - 3:25
 "Weeping and Mourning" - 3:48
 "Crucifixion" - 3:33
 "Miss Nadine" - 3:34
 "Madeleine a Gwan" - 3:45
 "Got to Mek a Living" - 3:35
 "DJ King" - 3:28
 "Moving On" - 3:57
 "Zion" - 3:45

References 

Beenie Man albums
2005 albums